Bros Music is a Central European record label owned by the major record company Sony Music Entertainment. The label is based in Germany and is the home to several successful chart acts, including E-Rotic, Marya Roxx, Bad Boys Blue, Gracia, Chris Norman and Virus Incorporation. The label was also the home of the girl group Vanilla Ninja from mid-2004 to late 2005, before the group parted company with Bros on bad terms. Bros Records is the primary home of all artists managed by David Brandes.

See also
 List of record labels
 David Brandes

External links
 Bros Music Official Website

Companies based in Baden-Württemberg
German record labels
Sony Music